Joe's Crab Shack is an American chain of beach-themed seafood casual dining restaurants. Founded in Houston, Texas, the restaurant now operates locations all across the United States.

History 

Joe's Crab Shack opened its first location in Houston, Texas in 1991. Landry's Restaurants, Inc. purchased the original Joe's in Houston in early 1994 to convert it into a Landry's Restaurant. By 1995 the chain had grown to three locations in Houston and one in Dallas.

On November 17, 2006, Joe's was sold to J.H. Whitney & Company, a privately held company, operating as JCS Holdings, LLC. The sales price was $192 million including the assumption of liabilities of $225 million.

JCS Holdings changed their name to Ignite Restaurant Group in April 2009 and operated the 130 existing Joe's and 26 Brickhouse Tavern and Tap restaurants. Ignite Restaurant Group went public in 2012.
 The company was headquartered on Westpark Drive near the Westchase District of Houston.

Ignite Restaurant Group filed for bankruptcy protection on June 6, 2017, and was re-acquired by Landry's, Inc. in August 2017 at bankruptcy auction for $57 million.

In August 2017, the chain closed 40 locations in several states amid bankruptcy proceedings as Landry's prepared to take over. Landry's has plans to re-focus the chain, and then to grow it again.

As of May 2021, the chain operates 44 locations in 18 states.

Photo controversy 

In March 2016, the Joe's location in Roseville, MN was criticized for including a photo of the Texas execution by hanging of Joseph Burleson, a black man convicted of murder, as table decor. The photo included a cartoon bubble reading "All I said was that I didn't like the gumbo." The use of the photo was condemned by the NAACP and the City of Roseville. A spokesman for Joe's Crab Shack apologized. This restaurant along with others has since been closed when Ignite Restaurant Group filed bankruptcy in 2017.

See also
 List of seafood restaurants

References

External links
Joe's Crab Shack official website

Landry's Inc.
Restaurants established in 1991
Seafood restaurants in the United States
Theme restaurants
Restaurants in Houston
Restaurant chains in the United States
1991 establishments in Texas
American companies established in 1991
2006 mergers and acquisitions
2012 initial public offerings
Companies that filed for Chapter 11 bankruptcy in 2017
2017 mergers and acquisitions
Fast-food seafood restaurants